The year 1936 in television involved some significant events.
Below is a list of television-related events during 1936.


Events
July 7 – At David Sarnoff's request for an experiment of RCA's electronic television technology, NBC's first attempt at actual programming is a 30-minute variety show featuring speeches, dance ensembles, monologues, vocal numbers, and film clips. It is shown to 225 of RCA's licensees on 22 centimeter screens, 343 lines per picture, 30 pictures per second.
August – 72 hours of medium-definition (180-line) television broadcasts of the 1936 Summer Olympics in Berlin are seen by approximately 150,000 people in public viewing rooms in Berlin and Potsdam.
November 2 – The first regular high-definition (then defined as at least 200 lines) television service from the BBC, based at Alexandra Palace in London, officially begins broadcasting (after test transmissions began in August). The service alternates on a weekly basis between John Logie Baird's 240-line mechanical system and the Marconi-EMI's 405-line all-electronic system. Programmes are broadcast daily, Monday to Saturday, at 15:00–16:00 and 20:00–22:00.
November 6 – NBC in New York demonstrates electronic television to invited members of the press, with a 40-minute program of live acts and films, received on 30 centimeter television screens.
First coaxial cables are laid between New York and Philadelphia by AT&T; they will transmit television and telephone signals.
By this year there are approximately 2,000 television receivers worldwide.

Debuts
October 8 – Picture Page (UK) is first broadcast as part of the BBC's test transmissions prior to launch (1936–1939; 1946–1952)
November 3 – Starlight (UK), a variety show, debuts on the BBC (1936–1939; 1946–1949).
Theatre Parade (UK) premieres on the BBC (1936–1938).

Television shows

Births 
January 1 – Valora Norland, actress
January 12 – Ron Harper, actress
January 25 – Diana Hyland, actress, Peyton Place (died 1977)
January 28 – Alan Alda, actor, star of M*A*S*H
February 3 – Mariclare Costello, actress, The Waltons
February 4 – Gary Conway, actor, Burke's Law
February 11 – Burt Reynolds, actor, Gunsmoke, Dan August, Evening Shade (died 2018)
February 14 –  Dave Roberts, broadcaster
February 20 
Larry Hovis, actor, Hogan's Heroes (died 2003)
Marj Dusay, actress, Guiding Light
February 29 – Alex Rocco, actor (died 2015)
March 5 – Dean Stockwell, actor, Quantum Leap (died 2021)
March 9 – Marty Ingels, actor (died 2015)
March 27 – Jerry Lacy, actor, Dark Shadows
April 5 – Glenn Jordan, television director
April 10 – John Madden, football coach and sportscaster (died 2021)
April 12 – Charles Napier, actor (died 2011)
April 14 – Arlene Martel, actress (died 2014)
April 18 – Richard A. Colla, actor, Days of Our Lives
April 22 – Glen Campbell, singer (died 2017)
April 24 – Jill Ireland, actress (died 1990)
May 5 – Sandy Baron, actor (died 2001)
May 9 – Glenda Jackson, actress
May 10 – Timothy Birdsall, English cartoonist (died 1963)
May 12 – Tom Snyder, talk show host (died 2007)
May 14 – Bobby Darin, singer and actor (died 1973)
May 15 – Anna Maria Alberghetti, singer and actress
May 17 – Dennis Hopper, actor (died 2010)
May 18 – Türker İnanoğlu, screenwriter
May 20 – Charles Kimbrough, actor (died 2023)
May 23 – Ingeborg Hallstein, actress
May 27 – Louis Gossett Jr., actor
May 30 – Keir Dullea, actor
June 8 – James Darren, actor
June 17 – Ken Loach, filmmaker
June 22 – Kris Kristofferson, actor
June 26 – Robert Downey Sr., actor (died 2021)
June 27 – Shirley Anne Field, actress
June 30 
Nancy Dussault, actress, Too Close for Comfort
Tony Musante, actor (died 2011)
Don Taylor, director (died 2003)
July 1 – Ron Masak, actor (died 2022)
July 9 – Timothy Johnson, television journalist
July 24 – Ruth Buzzi, actress, comedian, Rowan and Martin's Laugh-In
July 25 – Mary Ann Wilson, TV fitness instructor
July 28 – Jean Doumanian, producer
August 15 – Pat Priest, actress, The Munsters
August 18 – Robert Redford, actor
August 21 - Wilt Chamberlain, NBA basketball player (died 1999)
August 29 – John McCain, politician (died 2018)
September 13 – Joe E. Tata, actor, Beverly Hills, 90210
September 14 – Walter Koenig, actor, Ensign Chekhov on Star Trek
September 24 – Jim Henson, puppeteer, creator of The Muppets (died 1990)
September 25 – Juliet Prowse, actress (died 1996)
September 28 – Joel Fabiani, actor
October 14 – Carrie Nye, actress (died 2006)
October 16 – Peter Bowles, English actor, To The Manor Born (died 2022)
October 26 – Shelley Morrison, actress, Will & Grace (died 2019)
October 28 – Charlie Daniels, singer (died 2020)
October 31 – Michael Landon, actor and producer, Bonanza, Little House on the Prairie (died 1991)
November 2 – Jack Starrett, actor (died 1989)
November 6 – Roger Welsch, senior correspondent
November 19 – Dick Cavett, talk show host
December 3 – Mary Alice, actress (died 2021)
December 6 – Kenneth Copeland, American televangelist
December 8 – David Carradine, actor, Kung Fu (died 2009)
December 22 – Héctor Elizondo, actor, Chicago Hope, Last Man Standing
December 23 – James Stacy, actor (died 2016)
December 29 – Mary Tyler Moore, actress, The Dick Van Dyke Show, The Mary Tyler Moore Show (died 2017)

References